Chernor Mansaray (born February 5, 1976) is a Sierra Leonean former international footballer. Mansaray was a member of the Sierra Leone squad at the 1996 African Nations Cup in South Africa.

External links
 

Living people
1976 births
Sierra Leonean footballers
Sierra Leone international footballers
Expatriate footballers in Egypt
Association football forwards
People from Koinadugu District